Golmaal is the title of the following Indian films:

Gol Maal, 1979 Hindi comedy film directed by Hrishikesh Mukherjee starring Amol Palekar
Golmaal (1998 film), a Tamil film starring Selva
Golmaal (2008 film), a Bengali film starring Prosenjit Chatterjee
Golmaal (2017 film), a Bengali film starring Mithun Chakraborty
Golmaal (film series), a Hindi comedy film series directed by Rohit Shetty
Golmaal: Fun Unlimited, 2006 Hindi comedy film and the first installment of the Golmaal film series
Golmaal Returns, 2008 Hindi film sequel to Golmaal: Fun Unlimited
Golmaal 3, 2010 Hindi film sequel to Golmaal Returns
Golmaal Again, 2017 Hindi film sequel to Golmaal 3
Golmaal 5, 2023 Hindi film sequel to Golmaal